The 2019–20 season will be SC Pick Szeged's 44th competitive and consecutive season in the Nemzeti Bajnokság I and 58th year in existence as a handball club.

Players

Squad information

Goalkeepers
 16  Roland Mikler
 32  Mirko Alilović
 52  Martin Nagy
Left Wingers
8  Jonas Källman (c)
 10  Stefán Rafn Sigurmannsson
Right Wingers
 17  Bogdan Radivojević
 24  Mario Šoštarič
Line players
 22  Matej Gaber
 27  Bence Bánhidi
 45  Miklós Rosta

Left Backs
9  Richárd Bodó
 15  Nik Henigman
 21  Alen Blažević
Central Backs
 14  Joan Cañellas
 44  Dean Bombač
 89  Dmitry Zhitnikov
Right Backs
5  Jorge Maqueda
7  Luka Stepančić
 37  Stanislav Kašpárek

Transfers
Source:  hetmeteres.hu

 In:
 Bálint Fekete (loan from  Logroño)
 Roland Mikler (from Veszprém)
 Bogdan Radivojević (from  Rhein-Neckar Löwen)
 Miklós Rosta (from Tatabánya)
 Luka Stepančić (from  Paris Saint-Germain)

 Out:
 Zsolt Balogh (to Tatabánya)
 Bálint Fekete  (loan to  Cuenca)
  Pedro Rodríguez (to Balatonfüred)
  Stefan Sunajko (loan to  Sävehof)
  Marin Šego (to  Montpellier)

Club

Technical Staff

Source: Coaches, Staff

Uniform
Supplier: Adidas
Main sponsor: MOL / Pick / tippmix / OTP Bank / City of Szeged
Back sponsor: Lexus Szeged
Shorts sponsor: Groupama / Konica Minolta / Csányi Foundation

Competitions

Overview

Nemzeti Bajnokság I

League table

Results by round

Matches

Results overview

Hungarian Cup

Matches

Cancelled due to the COVID-19 pandemic.

EHF Champions League

Group stage

Matches

Results overview

Knockout stage

Round of 16

Statistics

Top scorers
Includes all competitive matches. The list is sorted by shirt number when total goals are equal.
Last updated on 28 December 2019

Attendances
List of the home matches:

References

External links
 
 MOL-Pick Szeged at eurohandball.com

SC Pick Szeged seasons
SC Pick Szeged